Devananda is a surname. Notable people with the surname include:

Douglas Devananda (born 1957), Sri Lankan politician
Devananda Bharali (1883–1972), Indian linguist, writer, translator, and dramatist

Tamil masculine given names